Koloděje is a municipal district (městská část) and cadastral area (katastrální území) in Prague. It is located in the eastern part of the city. As of 2008, there were 1206 inhabitants living in Koloděje.

The first written record of Koloděje is from the 13th century. The village became part of Prague in 1974.

External links 
 Praha-Koloděje - Official homepage

Districts of Prague